Attorney General Foley may refer to:

Matt Foley (politician) (born 1951), Attorney-General of Queensland
Roger D. Foley (1917–1996), Attorney General of Nevada

See also
General Foley (disambiguation)